Norbert Gombos was the defending champion but lost in the first round to Luca Vanni.

Aljaž Bedene won the title after defeating Antoine Hoang 4–6, 6–1, 7–6(8–6) in the final.

Seeds

Draw

Finals

Top half

Bottom half

References
Main Draw
Qualifying Draw

2018 ATP Challenger Tour
Singles